Dading may refer to:

 Da Ding, second king of the Shang dynasty
 Dafang County, Guizhou, China, formerly called Dading
 Dading (TV series), a 2014 Filipino family drama series
 Dading Subdistrict (大定街道), a subdistrict in Mengzhou, Henan, China
 Dading, a village in Liuji, Dawu County, Xiaogan, Hubei, China

Historical eras
Dading (大定, 555–562), era name used by Emperor Xuan of Western Liang
Dading (大定, 581), era name used by Emperor Jing of Northern Zhou
Dading (大定, 1161–1189), era name used by Emperor Shizong of Jin
Dading (大定, 1361–1363), era name used by Chen Youliang, emperor of Dahan